Time Takes Time is the 10th studio album by Ringo Starr. His first studio album since 1983's Old Wave, it followed a successful 1989–90 world tour with his first All-Starr Band. Released in 1992, Time Takes Time was a critically-acclaimed comeback album, and featured several celebrity guests including Brian Wilson, Harry Nilsson and Electric Light Orchestra front-man Jeff Lynne.

Background
In February 1987, Ringo Starr started work on his first new studio album in four years. Sessions began with producer Chips Moman in 3 Alarm Studios in Memphis, Tennessee. These sessions lasted for a few days then came to a halt before being resumed in April, with recording taking place at 3 Alarm Studios and Sun Studios. A month-long string of recording sessions were planned in August, for recording at Mayfair Recording Studios in London, before being halted shortly before recording had begun. These sessions were to have been handled by Elton John's manager, John Reid, and were intended to feature John. While on tour in July 1989 with the All-Starr Band, Starr was told that Moman was attempting to release the Memphis sessions as an album; Starr proceeded to sue Moman in August. An injunction was issued by the Fulton County Superior Courts to Starr in early January 1990, where he was to pay out costs of the sessions to Moman. It was announced at a National Association of Radio Merchandisers (NARM) convention that Starr signed a recording contract with Private Music in March 1991, who seemed to be the only label interested in him at the time.

Recording
Starr had initially intended to try out four producers, and select the best to record the whole album with: '...because it's been so long for me that I didn't really know any producers I wanted to go with for the whole record. So I figured I'd try a few people.' Aligning himself with top producers Don Was, Peter Asher, Phil Ramone and Jeff Lynne, the album was recorded sporadically between March and September 1991, and finished in February 1992. Jim Horn, who plays all the saxophone parts on the album, had previously worked on Starr's Ringo (1973). The material was written predominantly by outside writers, with Starr co-writing three songs. Time Takes Time also marked Starr's first alliance with Mark Hudson, who assisted with the background vocals and arrangements on some of the Ramone-produced tracks.

In April 1991, Starr recorded with fellow label artist, Taj Mahal, on his album. Lynne and Starr recorded four songs between 20 and 31 May: "Don't Go Where the Road Don't Go", "After All These Years", "Don't Be Cruel", and "Call Me". Lynne later remixed "Don't Go Where the Road Don't Go" at Ocean Way Studios. Starr contributed the song "You'll Never Know", recorded on 14 September at the tail-end of the album sessions, to the soundtrack of the film Curly Sue. "Weight of the World" was recorded in February 1992 in Los Angeles. Starr recorded "Runaways" and "All in the Name of Love", the latter written by Jerry Lynn Williams, with Ramone. With Asher, Starr recorded "Thank You for Being a Friend", written by Andrew Gold, The Posies' "Golden Blunders", and a McCartney–Starr song, "Angel in Disguise". Was' sessions were backed by a core group of musicians who he works with frequently featuring: Benmont Tench on keyboard, longtime Bonnie Raitt bassist James "Hutch" Hutchinson  and Mark Goldenberg on guitar. With Was, Starr recorded the Diane Warren–written song "In a Heartbeat", "What Goes Around" written  by Rick Suchow, and "Weight of the World", featuring Brian Wilson, and Jellyfish, on backing vocals respectively. Andy Sturmer and Roger Manning of Jellyfish also contributed the song "I Don't Believe You" and sang backing vocals on an arrangement basically mirroring their own version of the song.

Several tracks were left off the album. The primarily McCartney-penned song "Angel in Disguise", to which Starr added a verse, has never been released. Starr covered "Don't Be Cruel" but it was left off the album and was issued as the B-side of the CD single "Weight of the World" but was included on the Japanese edition of the album. Another outtake, "Everybody Wins", was issued in Germany as the B-side of the "Don't Go Where the Road Don't Go" single. Three more outtakes that were never released were "Thank You for Being a Friend", the Ramone-produced "Love Is Going to Get You", and the Lynne-produced "Call Me". Lynne has said that "Call Me" would never be released, which Tom Petty appears on. Although Starr had recorded and released another song entitled "Call Me" as far back as 1974, it bore no resemblance to the Lynne-produced number.

Release
Starr released an announcement about the album, the single "Weight of the World", and an All-Starr tour, on 28 February 1992. On 2 April, Starr held a press conference, stating the same three things, and in addition, tour dates, at Radio City Music Hall in New York. From 3 April, onwards for a few days, Starr made television appearances and radio broadcasts to promote the album and the tour. On the same day, promotional copies of "Weight of the World" were sent to radio stations in the US. Filming a music video for "Weight of the World" started on 16 May, and was finished the next day. CNN broadcast a behind-the-scenes report on making the video on 18 May. Starr performed the song, with his All-Starr band as backing musicians, on the TV show Arsenio. The single "Weight of the World" was released on 28 April in the US, and on 18 May in the UK.

Time Takes Time was released in the US on 22 May, and in the UK on 29 June, by Private Music. Starr commented that he had not 'been this happy with an album since Ringo in 1973. It's time I stretched.' However, the album failed to chart. While a planned single release on 3 July in the US of "Don't Go Where the Road Don't Go", backed with "Everyone Wins", was shelved, a CD edition of the single managed to get released in Germany on 21 September. The 7" vinyl edition of the single was also released in Germany and had "Don't Know a Thing About Love" as the B-side, released on the same day. Starr again appeared on Arsenio on 21 October, being interviewed and then performing "Don't Go Where the Road Don't Go" and "Act Naturally". Times Takes Time was released on vinyl only in Mexico, Brazil, Spain and Germany. Despite an All-Starr tour in 1992 to promote the album, Time Takes Time would be Starr's only release with Private Music before he was dropped from their roster.

Reception

Well-received upon release, many critics considered Time Takes Time Starr's best album since 1973's Ringo. Rolling Stone magazine wrote, "The drummer's most consistent, wide-awake album since Ringo, from 1973". The release was met with some indifference by the public, and thus failed to chart. Lead single "Weight of the World" managed to reach No. 74 in the UK charts.

Track listing

Personnel
Personnel per booklet.

 Ringo Starr – lead vocals, drums, percussion
 Jeff Lynne – guitar, bass, piano, keyboards, backing vocals (tracks 3 and 6 )
 Mark Goldenberg – guitar (tracks 1, 2 and 9)
 Waddy Wachtel – guitar (track 4)
 Andrew Gold – acoustic guitar, guitar (solo), backing vocals (track 4)
 Roger Manning – acoustic guitar, backing vocals (track 7)
 Andy Sturmer – acoustic guitar, backing vocals (track 7)
 Michael Landau – guitar (tracks 7, 9 and 10)
 David Grissom – acoustic guitar (tracks 7 and 10)
 Michael Thompson – guitar (tracks 5 and 8)
 Jeff Baxter – guitar (tracks 5 and 8)
 Mark Hart – keyboards, [Additional Synth Guitar], backing vocals (track 5)
 Benmont Tench – keyboards (tracks 1 and 2), piano, Hammond organ (tracks 7 and 10); Hammond, harmonium (track 9)
 Robbie Buchanan – keyboards (tracks 4 and 9)
 Jeffrey Vanston – keyboards (tracks 5 and 8)
 Jamie Muhoberac – keyboards (track 9) 
 James "Hutch" Hutchinson – bass (tracks 1, 2, 7, 9 and 10)
 Bob Glaub – bass (track 4)
 Neil Stubenhaus – bass (tracks 5 and 8)
 Peter Asher – tambourine, backing vocals (track 4)
 Mark Hudson – percussion, backing vocals
 Jim Horn – saxophone (track 3)

 Suzie Katayama – cello (track 3)
 Raven Kane – backing vocals
 Rosemary Butler – backing vocals
 Valerie Carter – backing vocals
 Terri Wood – backing vocals
 Carmen Twillie – backing vocals
 Wendy Fraser – backing vocals
 Stephanie Spruill – backing vocals
 Andrea Robinson – backing vocals
 Bobbi Page – backing vocals
 Doug Fieger – backing vocals
 Berton Averre – backing vocals
 Mark Hart – backing vocals
 Craig Copeland – backing vocals
 Naomi Star – backing vocals
 Darlene Koldenhoven – backing vocals
 Harry Nilsson – vocals (track 8)
 Kathryn Cotter – backing vocals
 Mark Warman – backing vocals
 Brian Wilson – backing vocals
 Brian O'Doherty – backing vocals

References
 Footnotes

 Citations

External links

Summary of Time Takes Time from "Complete U.K. Discography of John, Paul, George and Ringo"

Ringo Starr albums
Albums produced by Jeff Lynne
Albums produced by Don Was
1992 albums
Albums produced by Peter Asher
Albums produced by Phil Ramone
Private Music albums